Adderall and Mydayis are trade names for a combination drug called mixed amphetamine salts containing four salts of amphetamine. The mixture is composed of equal parts racemic amphetamine and dextroamphetamine, which produces a (3:1) ratio between dextroamphetamine and levoamphetamine, the two enantiomers of amphetamine. Both enantiomers are stimulants, but differ enough to give Adderall an effects profile distinct from those of racemic amphetamine or dextroamphetamine, which are marketed as Evekeo and Dexedrine/Zenzedi, respectively. Adderall is used in the treatment of attention deficit hyperactivity disorder (ADHD) and narcolepsy. It is also used illicitly as an athletic performance enhancer, cognitive enhancer, appetite suppressant, and recreationally as a euphoriant. It is a central nervous system (CNS) stimulant of the phenethylamine class.

Adderall is generally well-tolerated and effective in treating symptoms of ADHD and narcolepsy. At therapeutic doses, Adderall causes emotional and cognitive effects such as euphoria, change in sex drive, increased wakefulness, and improved cognitive control. At these doses, it induces physical effects such as a faster reaction time, fatigue resistance, and increased muscle strength. In contrast, much larger doses of Adderall can impair cognitive control, cause rapid muscle breakdown, provoke panic attacks, or induce a psychosis (e.g., paranoia, delusions, hallucinations). The side effects of Adderall vary widely among individuals, but most commonly include insomnia, dry mouth, loss of appetite, and weight loss. The risk of developing an addiction or dependence is insignificant when Adderall is used as prescribed at fairly low daily doses, such as those used for treating ADHD; however, the routine use of Adderall in larger daily doses poses a significant risk of addiction or dependence due to the pronounced reinforcing effects that are present at high doses. Recreational doses of amphetamine are generally much larger than prescribed therapeutic doses, and carry a far greater risk of serious adverse effects.

The two amphetamine enantiomers that compose Adderall (levoamphetamine and dextroamphetamine) alleviate the symptoms of ADHD and narcolepsy by increasing the activity of the neurotransmitters norepinephrine and dopamine in the brain, which results in part from their interactions with human trace amine-associated receptor 1 (hTAAR1) and vesicular monoamine transporter 2 (VMAT2) in neurons. Dextroamphetamine is a more potent  stimulant than levoamphetamine, but levoamphetamine has slightly stronger cardiovascular and peripheral effects and a longer elimination half-life than dextroamphetamine. The levoamphetamine component of Adderall has been reported to improve the treatment response in some individuals relative to dextroamphetamine alone. In 2020, Adderall was the 22nd most commonly prescribed medication in the United States, with more than 26million prescriptions.

Uses

Medical

Adderall is commonly used to treat attention deficit hyperactivity disorder (ADHD) and narcolepsy (a sleep disorder).

Available forms

Adderall is available as immediate-release (IR) tablets or two different extended-release (XR) formulations. The extended-release capsules are generally used in the morning. A shorter, 12-hour extended-release formulation is available under the brand Adderall XR and is designed to provide a therapeutic effect and plasma concentrations identical to taking two doses four hours apart. The longer extended-release formulation, approved for 16 hours, is available under the brand Mydayis. In the United States, the immediate and extended release formulations of Adderall are both available as generic drugs.

Enhancing performance

Adderall has been banned in the National Football League (NFL), Major League Baseball (MLB), National Basketball Association (NBA), and the National Collegiate Athletics Association (NCAA). In leagues such as the NFL, there is a very rigorous process required to obtain an exemption to this rule even when the athlete has been medically prescribed the drug by their physician.

Recreational

Adderall has high potential for misuse as a recreational drug. Adderall tablets can either be swallowed, crushed and snorted, or dissolved in water and injected. Injection into the bloodstream can be dangerous because insoluble fillers within the tablets can block small blood vessels.

Many postsecondary students have reported using Adderall for study purposes in different parts of the developed world. Among these students, some of the risk factors for misusing ADHD stimulants recreationally include: possessing deviant personality characteristics (i.e., exhibiting delinquent or deviant behavior), inadequate accommodation of disability, basing one's self-worth on external validation, low self-efficacy, earning poor grades, and having an untreated mental health disorder.

Contraindications

Adverse effects

The adverse side effects of Adderall are many and varied, but the amount of substance consumed is the primary factor in determining the likelihood and severity of side effects. Adderall is currently approved for long-term therapeutic use by the USFDA. Recreational use of Adderall generally involves far larger doses and is therefore significantly more dangerous, involving a much greater risk of serious adverse drug effects than dosages used for therapeutic purposes.

Overdose

Interactions
 Monoamine oxidase inhibitors (MAOIs) taken with amphetamine may result in a hypertensive crisis if taken within two weeks after last use of an MAOI type drug.
 Inhibitors of enzymes that directly metabolize amphetamine (particularly CYP2D6 and FMO3) will prolong the elimination of amphetamine and increase drug effects.
 Serotonergic drugs (such as most antidepressants) co-administered with amphetamine increases the risk of serotonin syndrome.
 Stimulants and antidepressants (sedatives and depressants) may increase (decrease) the drug effects of amphetamine, and vice versa.
 Gastrointestinal and urinary pH affect the absorption and elimination of amphetamine, respectively. Gastrointestinal alkalinizing agents increase the absorption of amphetamine. Urinary alkalinizing agents increase concentration of non-ionized species, decreasing urinary excretion.
 Proton-pump inhibitors (PPIs) modify the absorption of Adderall XR and Mydayis.
 Zinc supplementation may reduce the minimum effective dose of amphetamine when it is used for the treatment of ADHD.

Pharmacology

Mechanism of action

Amphetamine, the active ingredient of Adderall, works primarily by increasing the activity of the neurotransmitters dopamine and norepinephrine in the brain. It also triggers the release of several other hormones (e.g., epinephrine) and neurotransmitters (e.g., serotonin and histamine) as well as the synthesis of certain neuropeptides (e.g., cocaine and amphetamine regulated transcript (CART) peptides). Both active ingredients of Adderall, dextroamphetamine and levoamphetamine, bind to the same biological targets, but their binding affinities (that is, potency) differ somewhat. Dextroamphetamine and levoamphetamine are both potent full agonists (activating compounds) of trace amine-associated receptor 1 (TAAR1) and interact with vesicular monoamine transporter 2 (VMAT2), with dextroamphetamine being the more potent agonist of TAAR1. Consequently, dextroamphetamine produces more  stimulation than levoamphetamine; however, levoamphetamine has slightly greater cardiovascular and peripheral effects. It has been reported that certain children have a better clinical response to levoamphetamine.

In the absence of amphetamine,  will normally move monoamines (e.g., dopamine, histamine, serotonin, norepinephrine, etc.) from the intracellular fluid of a monoamine neuron into its synaptic vesicles, which store neurotransmitters for later release (via exocytosis) into the synaptic cleft. When amphetamine enters a neuron and interacts with VMAT2, the transporter reverses its direction of transport, thereby releasing stored monoamines inside synaptic vesicles back into the neuron's intracellular fluid. Meanwhile, when amphetamine activates , the receptor causes the neuron's cell membrane-bound monoamine transporters (i.e., the dopamine transporter, norepinephrine transporter, or serotonin transporter) to either stop transporting monoamines altogether (via transporter internalization) or transport monoamines out of the neuron; in other words, the reversed membrane transporter will push dopamine, norepinephrine, and serotonin out of the neuron's intracellular fluid and into the synaptic cleft. In summary, by interacting with both VMAT2 and TAAR1, amphetamine releases neurotransmitters from synaptic vesicles (the effect from VMAT2) into the intracellular fluid where they subsequently exit the neuron through the membrane-bound, reversed monoamine transporters (the effect from TAAR1).

Pharmacokinetics

Pharmacomicrobiomics

Related endogenous compounds

History 

The pharmaceutical company Rexar reformulated their popular weight loss drug Obetrol following its mandatory withdrawal from the market in 1973 under the Kefauver Harris Amendment to the Federal Food, Drug, and Cosmetic Act due to the results of the Drug Efficacy Study Implementation (DESI) program (which indicated a lack of efficacy). The new formulation simply replaced the two methamphetamine components with dextroamphetamine and amphetamine components of the same weight (the other two original dextroamphetamine and amphetamine components were preserved), preserved the Obetrol branding, and despite it lacking FDA approval, it still made it onto the market and was marketed and sold by Rexar for many years.

In 1994, Richwood Pharmaceuticals acquired Rexar and began promoting Obetrol as a treatment for ADHD (and later narcolepsy as well), now marketed under the new brand name of Adderall, a contraction of the phrase "A.D.D. for All" intended to convey that "it was meant to be kind of an inclusive thing" for marketing purposes. The FDA cited the company for numerous significant CGMP violations related to Obetrol discovered during routine inspections following the acquisition (including issuing a formal warning letter for the violations), then later issued a second formal warning letter to Richwood Pharmaceuticals specifically due to violations of "the new drug and misbranding provisions of the FD&C Act". Following extended discussions with Richwood Pharmaceuticals regarding the resolution of a large number of issues related to the company's numerous violations of FDA regulations, the FDA formally approved the first Obetrol labeling/sNDA revisions in 1996, including a name change to Adderall and a restoration of its status as an approved drug product. In 1997 Richwood Pharmaceuticals was acquired by Shire Pharmaceuticals in a $186 million transaction.

Richwood Pharmaceuticals, which later merged with Shire plc, introduced the current Adderall brand in 1996 as an instant-release tablet. In 2006, Shire agreed to sell rights to the Adderall name for the instant-release form of the medication to Duramed Pharmaceuticals. DuraMed Pharmaceuticals was acquired by Teva Pharmaceuticals in 2008 during their acquisition of Barr Pharmaceuticals, including Barr's Duramed division.

The first generic version of Adderall IR was introduced to market in 2002. Later on, Barr and Shire reached a settlement agreement permitting Barr to offer a generic form of the extended-release drug beginning in April 2009.

Commercial formulation
Chemically, Adderall is a mixture of four amphetamine salts; specifically, it is composed of equal parts (by mass) of amphetamine aspartate monohydrate, amphetamine sulfate, dextroamphetamine sulfate, and dextroamphetamine saccharate. This drug mixture has slightly stronger  effects than racemic amphetamine due to the higher proportion of dextroamphetamine. Adderall is produced as both an immediate release (IR) and extended release (XR) formulation. , ten different companies produced generic Adderall IR, while Teva Pharmaceutical Industries, Actavis, and Barr Pharmaceuticals manufactured generic Adderall XR. , Shire plc, the company that held the original patent for Adderall and Adderall XR, still manufactured brand name Adderall XR, but not Adderall IR.

Comparison to other formulations
Adderall is one of several formulations of pharmaceutical amphetamine, including singular or mixed enantiomers and as an enantiomer prodrug. The table below compares these medications (based on U.S.-approved forms):

Society and culture

Legal status 
 In Canada, amphetamines are in Schedule I of the Controlled Drugs and Substances Act, and can only be obtained by prescription.
 In Japan, the use, production, and import of any medicine containing amphetamines is prohibited.
 In South Korea, amphetamines are prohibited.
 In Taiwan, amphetamines including Adderall are Schedule 2 drugs with a minimum five years prison term for possession. Only Ritalin can be legally prescribed for treatment of ADHD.
 In Thailand, amphetamines are classified as Type 1 Narcotics.
 In the United Kingdom, amphetamines are regarded as Class B drugs. The maximum penalty for unauthorized possession is five years in prison and an unlimited fine. The maximum penalty for illegal supply is 14 years in prison and an unlimited fine.
 In the United States, amphetamine is a Schedule II prescription drug, classified as a central nervous system (CNS) stimulant.
 Internationally, amphetamine is in Schedule II of the Convention on Psychotropic Substances.

Shortages 
In February 2023, news organizations began reporting on shortages of Adderall in the United States that have lasted for over five months.

Notes 

Image legend

Reference notes

References

External links
 
 
 
 
 
 

 
Amphetamine
Anorectics
Aphrodisiacs
Combination drugs
Drugs acting on the cardiovascular system
Drugs acting on the nervous system
Ergogenic aids
Euphoriants
Excitatory amino acid reuptake inhibitors
5-HT1A agonists
Narcolepsy
Nootropics
Norepinephrine-dopamine releasing agents
Phenethylamines
Racemic mixtures
Stimulants
Substituted amphetamines
Takeda Pharmaceutical Company brands
TAAR1 agonists
Attention deficit hyperactivity disorder management
VMAT inhibitors
World Anti-Doping Agency prohibited substances